Michael James Hoiles Oliver (3 February 1945 – 2 March 2019) was a British sociologist, author, and disability rights activist. He was the first Professor of Disability Studies in the world, and key advocate of the social model of disability.

Early life
Oliver was born in Chatham, and grew up in Borstal near Rochester in Kent. He attended grammar school, leaving at 16 to work as a payroll clerk.  He broke his neck in 1962 while on holiday, and was treated at Stoke Mandeville Hospital.  He used a wheelchair after his accident.
 
He returned home after a year of rehabilitation. He worked in adult education at Borstal Prison (a Young Offenders Institution now HM Prison Rochester) and then took a degree in sociology.  He started his degree at the University of Reading in 1971, but the support arrangements were inadequate and he left after a few weeks.  He completed his bachelor's degree at the University of Kent, followed by a master's, and a doctorate completed in 1978.

Academic career
From 1979, he ran a course on Social Work with Disabled People at the University of Kent.  He published a book on Social Work with Disabled People in 1983.

Oliver published his book on The Politics of Disablement in 1990.  He became a key advocate of the social model of disability. This is the idea that much of the inconvenience and difficulty of living with a disability is not an inherent feature of the disability itself, but a failure of society to adapt to the needs of disabled people. While the distinction between "impairment" and "disability" had been made by the Union of the Physically Impaired Against Segregation, Oliver coined the term "social model" to describe this distinction, and popularized it.  He also coined the term "Emancipatory disability studies" by which he meant that researchers must not be "parasites" but instead serve the interests of disabled people.

At the time he retired, he was Emeritus Professor of Disability Studies at the University of Greenwich.

Publications 
His major publications include:

References

External links
 A paper on "The Individual and Social Models of Disability", 1990.

1945 births
2019 deaths
Academics of the University of Greenwich
British people with disabilities
British disability rights activists
Disability studies academics